Safari Sound Band is a Kenyan hotel pop band. In over twenty years of activity, they were certified platinum four times, and their recordings of Swahili classics such as "Jambo Bwana" (published with title "Jambo, Jambo") and "Malaika" are well-known. They have published a number of CDs, featuring cover versions of African evergreens as well as other easy listening Swahili pop tracks. The band consists of six elements (guitar, keyboards, saxophone, bass, drums, and percussions). All the band members also sing.

Partial discography
 Images of Kenya (1995).
 The Best of African Songs (1996, originally 1984). Track listing: "Jambo Jambo", "Pole Pole", "Nakupenda Wewe", "Music In Africa", "Coconut", "Kenya Safari", "Pole Musa", "Mombasa", "Lala Salama", "Karibuni Kenya", "Kilimanjaro", "Malaika", "Ahsante Sana", "Mama Sofia"
 Mombasa Moon (1999). Tracks listing: "Love Peace & Happiness", "Jambo Jambo", "Chakacha", "Simba", "Pole Pole", "Welcome Home", "Kenya Safari", "Coconut", "Mombasa Moon", "Malaika", "Pole Musa", "Lala Salama"
 East Coast Dreams (1999)
 Mambo Jambo (ARC 2001). Track listing: "Jambo Jambo", "Simba", "Kala Mashaka", "Hinde", "Pole Pole", "Nakupenda Wewe", "Chakacha", "Binti", "Mamake Asiya", "Watoto", "Mambo Jambo", "Mama Sofia", "Pole Musa", "Malaika"

References

External links
 

Kenyan musical groups